Ronald Crutchley (20 June 1922 – August 1987) was an English professional footballer.

Born in Walsall, Crutchley joined Walsall in 1945, where he gained a reputation as a "hard-working defensive wing-half". After 62 appearances in four seasons, he joined Shrewsbury Town in 1950. In 1954 he left Shrewsbury and signed for Wellington Town.

References

1922 births
Sportspeople from Walsall
English footballers
Walsall F.C. players
Shrewsbury Town F.C. players
Telford United F.C. players
1987 deaths
Association football midfielders